The following is a list of paintings by Rembrandt in order of appearance (catalogue numbers 1–420), that were attributed as autograph by Horst Gerson in 1968.

See also
 List of paintings by Rembrandt

Sources

 Rembrandt Paintings, by Horst Gerson, Meulenhoff International, 1968, 

 
Rembrandt Paintings
Rembrandt
Rembrandt studies